Juth Bahadur Khadgi (1943 – 26 August 2021), better known as JB Tuhure, was a Nepali singer and Member of Parliament (MP). He was titled Janagayak (people's singer) as he sang revolutionary songs; he recorded over 150 songs.

Tuhure was born Juth Bahadur Khadgi in Dharan, Province No. 1, Nepal. He lost his father when he was 20 years old, and since then started using Tuhure (which means orphan) as his surname. He died on 26 August 2021 in Kathmandu due to brain hemorrhage.

References 

1943 births
2021 deaths
20th-century Nepalese male singers
21st-century Nepalese male singers
People of the Nepalese Civil War
People from Dharan
Communist Party of Nepal (Maoist Centre) politicians
Members of the 2nd Nepalese Constituent Assembly